Rynninge IK is a Swedish football club located in Rynninge in north-eastern Örebro.

Background
Rynninge Idrottsklubb were founded in 1932 and have concentrated on the sports of football and handball.  The club now only participates in football but in the 1940s the club's handball team reached the quarterfinals of the Swedish Handball Championship.

Since their foundation Rynninge IK has participated mainly in the middle divisions of the Swedish football league system and has hovered mostly between Divisions 3 and 4 although in recent years this has been replaced by Divisions 2 and 3.  The club currently plays in Division 2 Norra Götaland which is the fourth tier of Swedish football. They play their home matches at the Grenadjärvallen in Örebro. This venue has been the club's home ground since 1944.

Rynninge IK are affiliated to the Örebro Läns Fotbollförbund.

In 2013 the team managed to get into the final stage of Svenska Cupen. They played their home games for that competition at Behrn Arena.

Season to season

Attendances

In recent seasons Rynninge IK have had the following average attendances:

Current squad

Footnotes

External links
 Rynninge IK – Official website
 Rynninge IK Facebook

Sport in Örebro
Football clubs in Örebro County
Association football clubs established in 1932
1932 establishments in Sweden